The Dome S101, later upgraded and raced as the Dome S101 Hb, S101 Hbi, and the Dome S101.5, is a sports prototype built and designed for use in the LMP1 class of the 24 Hours Of Le Mans, and other similar endurance races. The car was the predecessor to the Dome S102, and the Strakka-Dome S103. The car had its racing debut at the 2001 Barcelona 2 Hours and 30 minutes, the opening round of the 2001 FIA Sportscar Championship, with the Den Blå Avis racing team.

Development

Dome S101hb 
In March 2005, the car was shown to be early in its testing cycle, with the car having been shown testing, in photos released by Dome Co, ahead of the Le Mans Series Prologue at the Circuit Paul Ricard.

Dome S101.5 
Due to new regulations in LMP1 for the upcoming 2007 racing season, which meant that "Hybrid" rules LMP1 cars were to be barred from competing in any ACO Sanctioned event, Dome was forced to create a new variant of the car. In a bid to save costs, the lower half of the S101hb monocoque was retained, while a new double roll hoop assembly was attached, in place of the previously used single roll hoop, and air intake.

Competition History

2001 
The car had its racing debut at the 2001 Barcelona 2 Hours and 30 minutes, the opening round of the 2001 FIA Sportscar Championship, with the Den Blå Avis racing team. The car was joined by a second car in the championship, entered by Racing for Holland. The car had its inaugural win at the Mistrovství FIA Sportnovních Vozu, held at the Brno Circuit, in the Czech Republic.

FIA Sportscar Championship- SR1 Teams Championship

2002 
Racing for Holland re-entered their Dome chassis into the 2002 FIA Sportscar Championship, securing 1st in the Teams Championship. Dome won the 2002 FIA Sportscar Constructors Championship.

2003 
Racing for Holland would re-enter their Dome chassis into the 2003 FIA Sportscar Championship, winning the title for a 2nd Consecutive Year.

24 Hours of Le Mans

References 

Le Mans Prototypes